CP 47,497 or (C7)-CP 47,497 is a cannabinoid receptor agonist drug, developed by Pfizer in the 1980s. It has analgesic effects and is used in scientific research. It is a potent CB1 agonist with a Kd of 2.1 nM.

Homologue
On the 19th of January 2009, the University of Freiburg in Germany announced that an analog of CP 47,497 is the main active ingredient in the herbal "incense" product Spice, specifically the 1,1-dimethyloctyl homologue of CP 47,497. Both the dimethylheptyl and dimethyloctyl homologues were detected in different batches, with considerable variation in the concentration present in different samples that were analysed. The weaker dimethylhexyl and dimethylnonyl homologues were not found in any batches of smoking blends tested, but have been legally scheduled alongside the others in some jurisdictions, to forestall any potential use for this purpose. The 1,1-dimethyloctyl homologue of CP 47,497 is several times more potent than the parent compound, which is somewhat unexpected as the 1,1-dimethylheptyl is the most potent substituent in classical cannabinoid compounds such as HU-210. The unapproved use of these compounds in herbal smoking blends has led to a resurgence in legitimate scientific research into their use, and consequently the C8 homologue of CP 47,497 has been assigned a proper name, cannabicyclohexanol.

Legal status

Germany
On 22 January 2009, CP 47,497 was added to the German controlled drug schedules ("Betäubungsmittelgesetz"), along with its dimethylhexyl, dimethyloctyl and dimethylnonyl homologues.

France
CP 47,497 and its C6, C8, and C9 homologues were made illegal in France on 24 February 2009.

Latvia
CP 47,497 and its C6, C8, and C9 homologues were made illegal in Latvia on 28 November 2009.

Lithuania
CP 47,497 and its C6, C8, and C9 homologues were made illegal in Lithuania on 5 June 2009.

Sweden
CP 47,497 and its C6, C7, C8, and C9 homologues were made illegal in Sweden on 15 September 2009.

Romania
CP 47,497 and its C6, C7, C8, and C9 homologues were made illegal in Romania on 15 February 2010.(

United States
As of March 1, 2011, it is a schedule 1 drug.

See also 
 (C6)-CP 47,497
 (C8)-CP 47,497 also known as Cannabicyclohexanol
 (C9)-CP 47,497
 CP 50,556-1
 CP 55,244
 CP 55,940
 CP-945,598
 HHC
 O-1871

References 

Cyclohexanols
Cannabinoids
Designer drugs
Pfizer brands
Phenols
Alkyl-substituted benzenes
CB1 receptor agonists